Diana Ross' Greatest Hits is a compilation album by American singer Diana Ross. It was released by Motown Records on July 12, 1976 in the United States. In the United Kingdom and certain other territories the album was released under the title Greatest Hits 2 since a similar compilation, Greatest Hits, had already been released in 1972. It comprises songs from her studio albums Diana Ross (1970), Everything Is Everything (1970), Surrender (1971), Touch Me in the Morning (1973), Last Time I Saw Him (1973) and Diana Ross (1976) as well as soundtrack recordings.

The album reached number 13 on the US Billboard 200 and peaked at number 10 on the US Top R&B/Hip-Hop Albums, eventually selling over 650,000 copies. In the United Kingdom, it climbed to number 2 on the UK Albums Chart and reached gold status for sales in excess of 100,000 copies.

Critical reception

AllMusic editor Stephen Thomas Erlewine called the album "a good sampler, especially for casual fans who only want hits from this era."

Track listing

US edition

International edition

Charts

Weekly charts

Year-end charts

Certifications

References

1976 greatest hits albums
Diana Ross compilation albums
Motown compilation albums